The 1983–84 Segunda División was the 35th season of the Mexican Segunda División. The season started on 3 September 1983 and concluded on 6 July 1984. It was won by Zacatepec.

Changes 
 Unión de Curtidores was promoted to Primera División.
 Zacatepec was relegated from Primera División.
 UAT was promoted from Segunda División B.
 Tecomán was promoted from Tercera División.
 Tapatío and Cuautla were relegated from Segunda División.
 Querétaro was bought by new owners and renamed as Cobras.
 Tampico was sold, relocated to Oaxaca City and renamed as UABJO.
 Atlético Valladolid was sold to C.D. Irapuato.

As of this season, the competition system was modified. The away team victories awarded 3 points instead of two.

Teams

Western Zone

Group 1

Group 2

Results

First leg

Second leg

Eastern Zone

Group 3

Group 4

Results

First leg

Second leg

Championship stage

Group 1

Group 2

Final

Relegation Group

References 

1983–84 in Mexican football
Segunda División de México seasons